The Roman Catholic Diocese of Timișoara is a diocese in Romania established on 5 June 1930 by Pope Pius XI. The Diocese of Cenad, corresponding to approximately the same region, had been created in 1030 by Stephen I of Hungary.

The diocese covers the Romanian Banat—the counties of Timiș, Caraș-Severin, Arad and part of Mehedinți, of which 11.1% are Roman Catholic, with compact concentrations in the Krashovani areas near Reșița and Sânnicolau Mare. A plurality of its adherents are Hungarian, followed by Banat Swabians, Romanians, Banat Bulgarians, Croats, Slovaks and Czechs. It is subordinate to the Bucharest Archdiocese. Since 2018, its bishop is József-Csaba Pál.

See also
 Roman Catholic Diocese of Zrenjanin, in Serbian Banat

External links
 Description from the State Secretariat for Religious Affairs
https://gerhardus.ro/ Dieceza Romano-Catolică de Timișoara

Timisoara
Religious organizations based in Timișoara